Rolf Yelseth (25 February 1914 – 1968) was a South African gymnast. He competed in seven events at the 1952 Summer Olympics.

References

1914 births
1968 deaths
South African male artistic gymnasts
Olympic gymnasts of South Africa
Gymnasts at the 1952 Summer Olympics
Sportspeople from Durban